Claudius Cornelius Thomas (October 1, 1928 – April 6, 1987) was an Eastern Caribbean diplomat.

Career
From 1961 to 1962 he was Cadet Officer at the Commission for the West Indies in London.
In 1962 he was translator at the European Economic Community in Brussels.
From 1962 to 1963 he was Attaché to the International Institute of Administrative Sciences
From 1963 to 1972 he was Wissenschaftlicher Assistent at the Free University of Berlin
From 1972 to 1975 he was Assistant professor of International and Comparative law at the Free University of Berlin.
Beginning in 1975 he was Commissioner for the Eastern Caribbean Governments in London.
In 1979 he was commissioned as High Commissioner for St. Vincent and the Grenadines in London.
In 1981 he was commissioned as High Commissioner for Antigua and Barbuda in London.
In 1983 he was commissioned as High Commissioner for Saint Kitts and Nevis in London.
From  to  he was Ambassador of the Organisation of Eastern Caribbean States to the European Union.

References

1928 births
1987 deaths
British diplomats
High Commissioners of Antigua and Barbuda to the United Kingdom
Organisation of Eastern Caribbean States people
20th-century British diplomats